Victoria Cave may refer to:

 A cave near Settle, North Yorkshire 
 Victoria Fossil Cave in the Naracoorte Caves National Park, Australia
 , a cave in Cartagena, Spain